Louise Forsley  (born 7 June 1990 in Greenfield, Massachusetts, United States) is an International Women's motorcycle trials rider. Forsley rode the US NATC National Championships and the FIM World Trials Championships. Forsley is a two time Women's National Champion.
Louise competed in the 2012 Xgames in Los Angeles, California and took home the silver medal.

Biography
Forsley grew up in Bernardston, Massachusetts. She finished third in the 2004 US NATC Women's Trials Championship behind the Canadian Gas Gas duo of Christy Williams and Kerry Williams. She was selected as part of the US Trial des Nations team and traveled to Spain along with Nicole Bradford and  Debbie Evans Leavitt. The team finished 8th.

In 2005, she went one better with a runner-up position behind Christy Williams. Once more Forsley was selected for the US Women's Trial des Nations team, this time the event was held in Italy. The team of Forsley, Bradford and Sarah Duke finished in 9th place.

For the next several years she concentrated on riding the FIM Trial World Championship with a best result of 5th place in Spain during the 2008 Championship.

She returned to US National competition in 2011, taking the NATC Women's Expert Sportsman Championship after remaining unbeaten all year, putting together the perfect season, a feat she repeated the following year.

National Trials Championship Career

FIM World Women's Trials Championship Career

Honors
 NATC Women's Expert Sportsman Trials Champion 2006, 2011, 2012

Stunt Performance

Since 2015, Forsley has been doing theatrical and stunt performance as Black Widow for the show Marvel Universe Live!

Related Reading
NATC Trials Championship
FIM Trial World Championship

References 

Living people
People from Greenfield, Indiana
American sportswomen
American motorcycle racers
Motorcycle trials riders
Female motorcycle racers
People from Bernardston, Massachusetts
1988 births
21st-century American women